Jeff Harris may refer to:
 Jeff Harris (baseball) (born 1974), American baseball player
 Jeff Harris (footballer) (born 1931), Australian rules footballer
 Jeff Harris (politician) (born 1964), Member of the Missouri House of Representatives
 Jeff Harris (writer) (1935–2004), American television actor, producer and writer, co-creator of Diff'rent Strokes
 Jeff Harris (cartoonist), creator of Shortcuts (comics)
 Jeff Harris (Sacramento city council) – see César Chávez Park

See also
 Jeffrey Harris (disambiguation)
 Geoff Harris, Australian businessman 
 Geoffrey Harris, Canadian middle-distance runner